The pleasant gerbil (Gerbillus amoenus) is a species of rodent found mainly in Libya and Egypt, and possibly Mauritania to  Tunisia.  This species is about 6 cm in body length, with a brown agouti-style coat, a white belly and a very long tail. It is also known as the charming dipodil.

Pleasant gerbils as pets
Although rare, they are being kept and bred in captivity in Europe. Their speed and small size makes them more difficult to tame than some other gerbils species.  Enthusiasts also call them dips and dippys.

References

 e-Gerbil, Charming Dipodil

External links
 Charming Dipodil Diaries

Gerbillus
Rodents of North Africa
Mammals described in 1902
Taxa named by William Edward de Winton